Rutkowo may refer to the following places:
Rutkowo, Masovian Voivodeship (east-central Poland)
Rutkowo, Mrągowo County in Warmian-Masurian Voivodeship (north Poland)
Rutkowo, Szczytno County in Warmian-Masurian Voivodeship (north Poland)
Rutkowo, West Pomeranian Voivodeship (north-west Poland)